Gail Nicole Da Silva (born 6 February 1993) is an Indian model and beauty queen from Goa who won was crowned Femina Miss India United Continent 2014 and placed as first runner-up at the Miss United Continents 2014 pageant. She also won two special awards there including Best National Costume and Miss Photogenic at Miss United Continent 2014. Her national costume was designed by internationally acclaimed fashion designer and beauty pageant mentor Melvyn Noronha, who was also her mentor.

Early life and education
Gail was born into a Goan Catholic family. She went to St. Pius X Convent High School.She graduated from Dempo college of commerce and economics, Panaji, Goa.

Femina Miss India 2014
She was crowned as the Femina Miss United Continent 2014.
Gail was also crowned Femina Miss Timeless Beauty. She was mentored by international beauty pageant mentor Melvyn Noronha.

Miss United Continent 2014
She represented India at Miss United Continents 2014 and was crowned first runner-up there. She won two special awards at the pageant including Miss Photogenic and Best in National Costume. Her national costume was designed by internationally acclaimed fashion designer and beauty pageant mentor Melvyn Noronha.

Pond's Femina Miss India 2013
She was one of the top 10 finalists of Femina Miss India 2013, however she did not win the crown. She later  trained with internationally acclaimed fashion designer and beauty pageant mentor Melvyn Noronha and won at Femina Miss India 2014.

Pond’s Femina Miss India Goa 2013
She was crowned Femina Miss India Goa 2013. She also won Pond's Femina Miss Glowing Skin title at the pageant.

See also
 Radha Bartake

References

External links
Official Miss United Continent website
Official Miss Femina India website 

Living people
1993 births
2013 beauty pageants in India
Female models from Goa
Indian beauty pageant winners
Femina Miss India winners